Fossato di Vico is a town and comune of Umbria in the province of Perugia in Italy, at 581 m above sea‑level on the middle slopes of Mount Mutali.

It lies just off the SS 3 highway, the successor to the ancient Roman Via Flaminia, between Gualdo Tadino (7 km to the south), Sigillo (6 km north);Fabriano (15 km east) and Gubbio (20 km west) in Antiquity, a branch of the Via Flaminia may have traversed the town.

History
A rare bronze plaque with a brief inscription to the Dea Cupra in the ancient Umbrian language has been found in the territory of the comune, evidence of pre‑Roman habitation. Roman vestiges have been found as well, but not in quantities nor concentrations such as to warrant conclusively identifying Fossato with the ancient Helvillum, the site of which remains unknown: the other main candidate is Sigillo.

Fossato is known, however, to have been inhabited in the early Middle Ages, when it was the southernmost outpost of the Byzantine corridor, which its name seems to confirm: while fossato, meaning "ditch" in Italian, is not an uncommon placename, it is usually found on small creeks — but Fossato di Vico is on sharply sloping ground with no watercourse in the area, and it has therefore been proposed by local historians that the name is to be derived from Latin (and Byzantine Greek) fossatum, a ditch-fortified defensive work.

The specification "di Vico" was added to the name in 1862, to remember a noble of the Duchy of Spoleto. Fossato was part of the county of Nocera in the 9th century, and after the Vico it was a possession of the Bulgarelli family, who built the current castle. In 1386 it became a free commune, which was annexed to the Papal States in 1540.

Main sights
In the plain below, two Roman bridges are extant; both relate to the Via Flaminia.

The town walls date to the late Middle Ages and would be of no particular interest were it not for a covered rampart walk capable of accommodating wide carts: it was designed for supplying the town in case of a siege. A very ruined tower at the top of the town is lovingly preserved as the oldest structure, and is said by some to be Byzantine, but without evidence.

The main churches are S. Sebastiano, the 16th‑century parish church, damaged in the 1997 Umbria and Marche earthquake but almost immediately restored; S. Pietro, the former parish church, medieval; S. Benedetto, also medieval, with some frescoes; and La Piaggiola, a small votive chapel of uncertain use, but likely belonging to a penitential confraternity: on its walls are to be found the best medieval frescoes in town.

Also in the plain, mention should be made of the shrine of the Madonna della Ghea.

Economy
The economic engine of the comune is the frazione of Osteria del Gatto, in the plain below, with several factories (cheese, packaging materials). An unusual aspect of the town's economy is that the municipal government has taken advantage of the winds sweeping the Cima del Mutali to contract the construction of two windmills for electrical generation; Fossato is a net exporter of electrical energy, and the installation turns a profit used for the operations of local government.

References

External links

Pro Fossato (the Pro Loco)
La Rumiola
Thayer's Gazetteer of Umbria

Hilltowns in Umbria